George Mauleverer Gowan (6 February 1818 – 15 July 1890) was an English first-class cricketer and British Army officer.

The son of George Cowan, he was born in February 1818 at Madras in British India. He was educated in England, firstly at Charterhouse School from 1829–32, before attending Harrow School from June 1832–1836. He purchased a commission in the 97th Regiment of Foot as an ensign in February 1837. Gowan purchased the rank of lieutenant in May 1839, before purchasing the rank of captain in April 1845. He made his debut in first-class cricket for the Marylebone Cricket Club against Cambridge University at Lord's in 1849, before making a second first-class appearance seventeen years later in 1862 for the Gentlemen of the North against the Gentlemen of the South at Nottingham. Playing as a wicket-keeper, Gowan scored 21 runs in his two matches, as well as taking two catches and making a single stumping. He married Anne Stratton in 1849 and lived at Leamington Spa. Gowan died at Marylebone in July 1890.

References

External links

1818 births
1890 deaths
People from Chennai
People educated at Charterhouse School
People educated at Harrow School
Queen's Own Royal West Kent Regiment officers
English cricketers
Marylebone Cricket Club cricketers
Gentlemen of the North cricketers
Military personnel of British India